The Mozambique national beach soccer team represents Mozambique in international beach soccer competitions and is controlled by the Mozambican Football Federation, the nation's governing body for football. They have qualified for the Africa Beach Soccer Cup of Nations four times, and made their Beach Soccer World Cup debut in 2021.

Results and fixtures

The following is a list of match results in the last 12 months, as well as any future matches that have been scheduled.

Legend

2021

Players

Current squad
The following players and staff members were called up for the 2021 FIFA Beach Soccer World Cup.

Head coach: Abineiro Adolfo Ussaca
Assistant coach: José Fernando Machava
Goalkeeping coach: Sérgio Paulo Munjovo

Competitive record

FIFA Beach Soccer World Cup

Africa Beach Soccer Cup of Nations
The Mozambique national beach soccer team was created for the 2007 CAF Beach Soccer Championship. They have never qualified from the group stage, only ever registering two wins before the 2021 edition: one against South Africa in 2008 and one on penalties against Libya in 2009.

References

External links
Mozambique at BSWW
 Mozambique at Beach Soccer Russia

Beach soccer
African national beach soccer teams